Kittampalayam is a village near Mettupalayam, Coimbatore district, Tamil Nadu state, India. The Village is located at the latitude of 11°15'48.5"N and longitude of 76°55'19.7"E. The village has nearly 500 families which include above 1300 voters.

Villages in Coimbatore district